
Year 579 (DLXXIX) was a common year starting on Sunday (link will display the full calendar) of the Julian calendar. The denomination 579 for this year has been used since the early medieval period, when the Anno Domini calendar era became the prevalent method in Europe for naming years.

Events 
 By place 

 Byzantine Empire 
 Byzantine-Sassanid War: King Khosrau I seeks peace, but dies before an agreement can be reached. The Mesopotamian front becomes stalemated, and Maurice (magister militum of the East) fortifies the borders in Armenia and Syria.

Central America
September 2 – Uneh Chan becomes the ruler of the Mayan city state of Calakmul in southern Mexico and reigns until 611.

 Europe 
 Hermenegild, son of Visigothic king Liuvigild, marries Ingund. He rebels against his father, starting in Seville (Southern Spain), and declares himself Catholic. 
 Heavy taxes levied by Merovingian king Chilperic I of Neustria produce a revolt at Limoges (central France), as he sells bishoprics to the highest bidder.

 Britain 

 Frithuwald succeeds his brother Theodoric as king of Bernicia (Scotland). He rules from 579–585 (approximate date).

 Persia 
 Khosrau I dies after a 48-year reign, during which he has extended his realm from the River Oxus to the Red Sea. He is succeeded by his son Hormizd IV, who becomes king of the Persian Empire.
 Summer – Hormizd IV refuses to give up territories, and breaks off negotiations with the Byzantine Empire. The Türks invade Khorasan and reach Hyrcania on the Caspian Sea.

 Asia 

 Emperor Xuan Di abdicates the throne to his son Jing Di, age 6, and rules as regent the Northern Zhou Dynasty.
 Jinpyeong becomes king of the Korean kingdom of Silla.

 By topic 

 Religion 
 July 30 – Pope Benedict I dies after a 4-year reign, and is succeeded by Pelagius II as the 63rd pope. During the Lombard siege of Rome, he labors to solve the problems of famine.
 Pelagius II sends Gregory as his apocrisiarius (ambassador to the imperial court in Constantinople). He is part of a Roman delegation to ask for military aid against the Lombards. 
 Leander, Catholic bishop of Seville, is exiled by Liuvigild and withdraws to Constantinople. At the Byzantine court he composes works against Arianism (approximate date).

Births 
 Fang Xuanling, chancellor of the Tang Dynasty (d. 648)

Deaths 
 July 30 – Pope Benedict I
 Khosrau I, king of the Persian Empire
 Theodric, king of Bernicia (Scotland)

References 

Bibliography